The 2009 BMW Open was a tennis tournament that was played on outdoor clay courts. It was the 94th edition of the BMW Open, and part of the ATP World Tour 250 series of the 2009 ATP World Tour. The men's events took place in Munich, Germany, from 2 May through 10 May 2009.

The men's draw was headlined by the defending champions, Chilean Fernando González and Croatian Marin Čilić.

Entrants

Seeds

 Seedings are based on the rankings of April 27, 2009.

Other entrants
The following players received wildcards into the main draw:

  Daniel Brands
  Lleyton Hewitt
  Andreas Beck

The following players received entry from the qualifying draw:

  Thiemo de Bakker
  Dieter Kindlmann
  Alexander Peya
  Sascha Klör
  Lamine Ouahab (lucky loser)
  Stéphane Bohli (lucky loser)

Finals

Singles

  Tomáš Berdych defeated  Mikhail Youzhny, 6–4, 4–6, 7–6(7–5)
It was Berdych's first title of the year and 5th of his career.

Doubles

  Jan Hernych /  Ivo Minář defeated  Ashley Fisher /  Jordan Kerr, 6–4, 6–4

References

External links
Official website 
Singles Draw
Qualifying Singles Draw